, also known as 11 Samurai, is a 1967 Japanese jidaigeki (period drama) film directed by Eiichi Kudo. This is the third and final chapter in Kudo's Samurai Revolution trilogy. The plot is a samurai epic with a loose historical basis. "The young Lord Nariatsu was probably modeled after the real life figure of Matsudaira Nariyoshi, also known as Matsudaira Tokunosuke (1819-1839)," who was the 19th or the 20th son of the Shōgun Ienari (1787-1837) and the younger brother of the Shōgun Ieyoshi (1837-1853). "Nariyoshi died when he was 19 years old--a perfect fit for this story.  The circumstances surrounding his death are obscure, which is also very convenient for dramatic purposes."

Plot
This black and white film is set in November 1839, during the final decades of Japan's Tokugawa shogunate. The retired Shōgun's youngest son, Lord Nariatsu, crosses into the neighboring Oshi fief, while he's hunting. Confronted by the Clan Lord Abe Masayori for trespassing in his lands of Oshi, Nariatsu kills him in a fit of pique and rides home. The Oshi fief retainers appeal to the Shōgun's Council of Elders for justice. Not wishing to embarrass the Shōgun's Tokugawa Clan, Chief Secretary Mizumo rewrites the event with Clan Lord Abe in the wrong and Lord Nariatsu defending himself. For this "attack," the Oshi fief is to be abolished at the end of the month, and the lands will be given to Lord Nariatsu as compensation.

Angered by this gross injustice, Chief Retainer Tatewaki approaches childhood friend, Sengoku Hayato, and asks him to avenge their Lord's murder. Hayato agrees to assemble a small band of loyal samurai. Hayato and nine Oshi fief samurai vow to trade their lives for justice. They locate Nariatsu in Edo (feudal Tokyo). They are joined by Ido Daijuro, a rōnin (wandering samurai) with a similar thirst for revenge.

Hayato and his ten followers pursue Nariatsu from the brothels of Edo as he travels home to the safety of his fortified castle in the Tatebayashi fief. As they are about to ambush Nariatsu and his bodyguards, Hayato receives a letter from Tatewaki. He orders Hayato not to kill Nariatsu, because the Council is reconsidering the decision to abolish the Oshi fief. Some samurai refuse to obey. Hayato enforces Tatewaki's order, because obedience is a samurai's first duty. Later, Daijuro tells the others that Hayato has more reason to disobey than they do. His wife, Lady Orie, has already committed jigai in anticipation of Nariatsu's death and the retired Shōgun's wrath.

When Tatewaki discovers that Councilor Mizumo lied, he rides to Hayato and orders him to kill Nariatsu. Ashamed that he was duped, Tatewaki commits seppuku. The eleven samurai ride hard and catch Nariatsu and his bodyguards at a river crossing. A great battle ensues. Hayato kills Nariatsu. At the end, only Hayato and Gyobu are standing. Since they are both disgraced and masterless samurai, they have no duty or purpose in life except to kill each other.

Daijuro appears—he has dispatched the last of the bodyguards. Daijuro cuts off Nariatsu's head and walks away, happy in his vengeance. When the rumors of the kataki-uchi (vendetta) spread, the Oshi fief is restored to the Abe clan. And, the Council of Elders releases a statement that the retired Shōgun's youngest son has died of an illness.

Cast
(Character names follow the pattern of Japanese names, with the family surname placed first)
 Deputy Chief Retainer Sengoku Hayato (Isao Natsuyagi) – The leader of the eleven samurai. Tatewaki's childhood friend and the Captain of the Oshi fief's cavalry. 
 Mitamura Kenshiro (Kōtarō Satomi) – Hayato's right-hand man. Leader of an unsuccessful assassination attempt on Lord Nariatsu's life. 
 Chief Retainer Tatewaki (Kōji Nanbara) – The chamberlain of the Oshi fief and the leader of the Abe clan samurai.
 Lady Orie (Junko Miyazono) – Hayato's faithful wife.  
 Lady Nui (Eiko Okawa) – The sister of one of the original samurai, who died of tuberculosis. She offered her sword in her brother's place, so her family wouldn't be dishonored by the brother's unfulfilled vow.
 Secretary Mizumo Echizen (Kei Satō) – The head of the Shōgun's Council of Elders. A corrupt statesman who is concerned about appearances and his own position.
 Lord Mastudaira Nariatsu (Kantarō Suga) – A spoiled and arrogant aristocrat. The retired Shōgun's youngest and most favored son.  
 Chief Retainer Akiyoshi Gyobu (Ryūtarō Ōtomo) – Lord Nariatsu's chamberlain of the Tatebayashi fief and the leader of his samurai. A samurai skilled in swordplay and strategy. The retired Inspector General of Japan.
 Ido Daijuro (Kō Nishimura) – A young, disillusioned rōnin, who thirsts to avenge his sister, father, and older brother.

Reception
On the review aggregator website Rotten Tomatoes, Eleven Samurai has an aggregate score of 71%.

The Samurai Revolution trilogy follows the "commercial formula along the lines of the traditional Chushingura / 47 Rōnin story, especially the third film, 11 Samurai, about a violent vendetta in the midst of existential uncertainty."

Home media
The film was released on DVD in the United States on 6 November 2012 by Animeigo.

References

External links 
 

1967 films
1960s action films
Japanese action films
Films directed by Eiichi Kudo
Samurai films
Jidaigeki films
Toho films
Films scored by Akira Ifukube
1960s Japanese films